The Glittering Prizes is a British television drama by Frederic Raphael about the changing lives of a group of Cambridge students, starting in 1952 and following them through to middle age in the 1970s.  It was first broadcast on BBC2 in January 1976 and later adapted into a novel of the same name.

Episodes

Episode 1 ‘An Early Life’ aired 21 January 1976
Plot outline: It is the mid-1950s, Adam Morris (Tom Conti) begins his career as a Cambridge undergraduate on a scholarship. Some of Adam's views about class and religious faith are tested by an aristocratic fellow undergraduate who shares his rooms. The series's characters are introduced by  their involvement in a play by the Cambridge Footlights.

Episode 2 ‘A Love Life’ aired 28 January 1976
Plot outline: Still the mid fifties., Adam marries Barbara (Barbara Kellerman), despite parental opposition, whilst Joyce (Angela Down) finds herself pregnant by Alan (John Gregg (actor)) but marries Dan (Malcolm Stoddard).

Episode 3 ‘A Past Life’ aired 4 February 1976
Plot outline: The early 1960s,  Adam (Tom Conti) has a bruising encounter with a famous writer Stephen Taylor (Eric Porter) who was once a fascist sympathiser but then goes on to write an Oscar-winning screenplay.

Episode 4 ‘A Country Life’ aired 11 February 1976
Plot outline: The mid sixties. Set at a boys' approved school Joyce (Angela Down) must finally face up to some unpleasant truths about her seemingly idyllic marriage to Dan (Malcolm Stoddard), now a teacher, when their old Cambridge friend  Alan (John Gregg (actor)), now a media personality,  drops in.

Episode 5 ‘An Academic Life’ aired 18 February 1976
Plot Outline: the late sixties. Accusations of racism are made by student militants at a  plate glass university featuring, Dinsdale Landen as Gavin Pope, Ray Smith (actor) as Austin Denny, Clive Merrison as Bill Bourne, Suzanne Stone as Joann Bourne, Tim Pigott-Smith as Tim Dent, Carolle Rousseau as Jeanne Dent.

Episode 6 ‘A Double Life’ aired 25 February 1976
Plot outline: It’s 1976, Adam (Tom Conti), by now a famous writer, copes with the death of his father and tragedies in the personal lives of some old Cambridge friends.

Cast (selected)

Related works 
 Fame and Fortune (2007) novel (sequel to The Glittering Prizes). Broadcast by BBC Radio 4 in six episodes October–November 2007
 Final Demands (2010) novel (sequel to Fame and Fortune). Broadcast by BBC Radio 4 in six episodes March 2010

References

External links
 

BBC television dramas
1970s British drama television series
1976 British television series debuts
1976 British television series endings
English-language television shows
Films directed by Waris Hussein